This list of the Cenozoic life of Washington contains the various prehistoric life-forms whose fossilized remains have been reported from within the US state of Washington and are between 66 million and 10,000 years of age.

Chlorophytes
 Botryococcus
Undescribed Late Pleistocene Manis Mastodon site subfossil
 Pediastrum
Undescribed Late Pleistocene Manis Mastodon site subfossil

Foraminifera
 Amphimorphina
 †Amphimorphina californica
 Amphistegina
 undescribed Eocene Crescent Formation fossil(s) 
 Bulimina
 Cf. †Bulimina jacksonensis
 Cassidulina
 Cf. †Cassidulina galvinensis 
 Chilostomella
 Cf. †Chilostomella oolina
  Cibicides
 †Cibicides cushmani
 †Cibicides midwayensis
 Cibicidoides
 †Cibicidoides coalingensis
 Dentalina
 Cf. †Dentalina consorbrina 
 Cf. †Dentalina dusenburyi 
 Cf. †Dentalina hispidocostata 
 †Dentalina longiscata

 Eggerella
 Cf. †Eggerella bradyi 
 Elphidium
 Eponides
 †Eponides mexicana
 †Eponides yeguaensis

 Gaudryina
 †Gaudryina jacksonensis
  Globigerina
 Undescribed Late Eocene Whiskey Creek methane-seep fossil
 Globobulimina
 †Globobulimina pacifica
 Globocassidulina
 †Globocassidulina globosa
 Guttulina
 †Guttulina frankei
 Gyroidina
 †Gyroidina orbicularis
 Haplophragmoides
 Undescribed Late Eocene Whiskey Creek methane-seep fossil
 †Involutina
 Cf. †Involutina incertus
 Lenticulina
 Lenticulina rancocasensis
 Undescribed Late Eocene Whiskey Creek methane-seep fossil
 Undescribed Ypresian Crescent Formation fossil
 Marginulina
 †Marginulina subbulata
 Martinottiella
 †Martinottiella communis
 Plectofrondicularia
 Cf. †Plectofrondicularia vaughani
 †Pseudoglandulina
 Cf. †Pseudoglandulina inflata 
 Pyrgo
 Cf. †Pyrgo lupheri
 Quinqueloculina
 †Quinqueloculina imperalis
 †Quinqueloculina imperialis
 Robulus
 Cf. †Robulus texanus
 Cf. †Quinqueloculina minuta
 Sigmomorphina
 †Sigmomorphina schencki
 Uvigerina
 †Uvigerina garzaensis

Plants

Plants A
 Abies
 Abies milleri - type locality for the species
Undescribed Miocene Vantage flora petrified woods.
Undescribed Late Pleistocene Manis Mastodon site subfossil(s)
 Acer
 †"Acer" arcticum
 †Acer beckianum - type locality for species
 †Acer bendirei
 †Acer browni
  †Acer chaneyi
 †Acer hillsi - type locality for species
 †Acer knolli - type locality for species
 †Acer latahense - type locality for species
 †Acer medianum
 †Acer niklasi
 †Acer olearyi - type locality for species
 †Acer puratanum - type locality for species
 †Acer republicense - type locality for species
 †Acer spitzi - type locality for species
 †Acer stonebergae
 †Acer tigilense
 †Acer toradense - type locality for species
 †Acer washingtonense - type locality for species
 †Acer wehri - type locality for the species
 †Acer whitebirdense
 Adiantum
 †Adiantum anastomosum - type locality for species
 Aesculus
 †Aesculus hankinsii - type locality for species
 Undescribed Ypresian Klondike Mountain Formation fossil(s)
 †Allantodiopsis
 †Allantodiopsis erosa
 †Allantodiopsis pugetensis
 undescribed species
 †Allophylus
 Cf. †Allophylus duktothensis
 Alnus
 †Alnus carpinoides
 †Alnus corrallina
 †Alnus kluckingi - type locality for species
 †Alnus operia
  †Alnus parvifolia - type locality for species 
 †Alnus relatus - type locality for species
 Amelanchier
 undescribed Ypresian Klondike Mountain Formation fossil(s)
 Amentotaxus
 undescribed Ypresian Klondike Mountain Formation fossil(s)
 †Anacardites
 †Anacardites franklinensis – type locality for species
 Anemia
 †Anemia elongata
 Aralia 
 undescribed Ypresian Klondike Mountain Formation fossil(s)
 Arbutus
 †Arbutus idahoensis - type locality for species
 undescribed Ypresian Klondike Mountain Formation fossil(s)
 Arceuthobium
Undescribed Late Pleistocene Manis Mastodon site subfossil(s)
 Arctostaphylos
 Arctostaphylos uva-ursi
 Artemisia
Undescribed Late Pleistocene Manis Mastodon site subfossil(s)
 Asplenium
 Cf. †Asplenium delicata
 Athyrium
 †Athyrium gracilium - type locality for species
 †Averrhoites
 Undescribed Ypresian Klondike Mountain Formation fossil(s)
 †Azolla
 †Azolla primaeva

Plants B
 †Barghoornia - type locality for genus
 †Barghoornia oblongifolia - type locality for species
 Berberis
Undescribed Late Pleistocene Manis Mastodon site subfossil
 Betula
 †Betula heteromorpha
 †Betula largei
  †Betula leopoldae - type locality for species
 Cf. Betula papyrifera
 †Bohlenia
 †Bohlenia americana - type locality for species
 Cf. Boniodendron
 †"Koelreuteria" arnoldii - referred to Cf. Boniodendron without rename
  Botrychium
Undescribed Late Pleistocene Manis Mastodon site subfossil
 Cf. Bursera
 Undescribed Eocene Puget Group fossil

Plants C
 Caesalpinia
 †Caesalpinia spokanensis - type locality for species (syn= Meibomites lucens)
 †Calkinsia - type locality of genus
 †Calkinsia franklinensis - type locality for species
 Calocedrus
 Undescribed Ypresian Klondike Mountain Formation fossil(s)
 Cf. †Calkinsia plafkeri
 †Calycites
 †Calycites ardtunensis
 Calycocarpum
 Undescribed Ypresian Klondike Mountain Formation fossil(s) 
 Camellia
 †Camellia multiforma
 Carex
Undescribed Late Pleistocene Manis Mastodon site subfossil
 Carpinus   
 †Carpinus perryae
 Carya
 †Carya cashmanensis – type locality for species
 †Carya pugetensis - type locality for species
 †Carya washingtonensis - type locality for species
 Undescribed Ypresian Klondike Mountain Formation fossil(s)
 Castanea
 †Castanea orientalis
 †Castaneophyllum
 Undescribed Ypresian Klondike Mountain Formation fossil(s)
 Castanopsis
 †Castanopsis franklinensis – type locality for species
 †Cedrelospermum
 Undescribed Ypresian Klondike Mountain Formation fossil(s)
 Cedrus
 Celastrus
 †Celastrus spokanensis
 Cephalotaxus
 †Cephalotaxus bonseri - type locality for species
 Undescribed Ypresian Klondike Mountain Formation fossil(s)
 Ceratophyllum
  Ceratophyllum demersum
  Cercidiphyllum
 †Cercidiphyllum crenatum
 †Cercidiphyllum obtritum
 †Cercidiphyllum piperoides
 Chamaecyparis
 †Chamaecyparis linguaefolia
 Undescribed Ypresian Klondike Mountain Formation fossil(s)
 Cheilanthes
Undescribed Late Pleistocene Manis Mastodon site subfossil(s)
 Chenopodium
Undescribed Late Pleistocene Manis Mastodon site subfossil(s)
 Cladrastis
 †Cladrastis pugetensis – type locality for species
 Clematis
 Undescribed Ypresian Klondike Mountain Formation fossil(s)
 Cocculus
 Cf. †Cocculus flabella
  Comptonia
 †Comptonia columbiana
 †Comptonia hesperia
 Cornus
 Cornus sericea (syn=Cornus stolonifera)
 Undescribed Ypresian Klondike Mountain Formation fossil(s)
 Corylopsis
 †Corylopsis reedae - type locality for species
 Corylus
  †Corylus johnsonii
 Craigia
 Undescribed Ypresian Klondike Mountain Formation fossil(s)
 Cf. Crataegus
 Undescribed Ypresian Klondike Mountain Formation fossil(s)
 †Cruciptera
 †Cruciptera simsonii
 Cryptomeria
 Undescribed Ypresian Klondike Mountain Formation fossil(s)
  Cyathea
 †Cyathea inequilateralis (syn = Cyathea pinnata)
 Cf. Cystopteris
 Undescribed Ypresian Klondike Mountain Formation fossil(s)

Plants D
 Danaea
 †Danaea borealis - type locality for species
 Decodon
 Undescribed Ypresian Klondike Mountain Formation fossil
 Dennstaedtia
†Dennstaedtia christophelii - type locality for species
 †Dennstaedtia delicata - type locality for species
 †Deviacer
 Undescribed Ypresian Klondike Mountain Formation fossil
  †Dillhoffia
 †Dillhoffia cachensis
 Diospyros
 †Diospyros washingtoniana - type locality for species
 †Diplodipelta
 †Diplodipelta miocenica
 Dipteronia
 †Dipteronia brownii
 †Dryophyllum
 †Dryophyllum pugetensis – type locality for species
  Dryopteris
 †Dryopteris chuckanutensis - type locality for species
 †Dryopteris gibbsi - type locality for species
 †Dryopteris whatcomensis - type locality for species

Plants E
 Eleocharis
 undescribed Late PLeistocene Manis Mastodon site subfossil
 Ephedra
 †Equisetum
 †Equisetum alexanderi - type locality for species
 †Equisetum newberryi - type locality for species
 Undescribed Klondike Mountain Formation fossils
 Eucommia
  †Eucommia montana

Plants F
 
 †Fagopsis
 †Fagopsis undulata
 Fagus
 †Fagus langevinii
 †Fagus washoensis
 †Florissantia
  †Florissantia quilchenensis
 Fothergilla
  †Fothergilla malloryi - type locality for species
 †Fraxinus
 Cf. †Fraxinus yubaensis

Plants G

  Galium
 Undescribed Late Pleistocene Manis Mastodon site subfossil
 Ginkgo
 †Ginkgo beckii - type locality of the species
 Ginkgo biloba
  †Ginkgo dissecta
 Gleditsia
 †Gleditsia columbiana - type locality for species
  Glyptostrobus
 †Glyptostrobus nordenskiöldii
 Undescribed Ypresian Klondike Mountain Formation fossil
 †Goweria - type locality of genus
 †Goweria dilleri
 †Goweria linearis - type locality for species

Plants H

 †Hamamelites
 Cf. †Hamamelites voyana
Hesperomeles
 Tentatively identified undescribed Ypresian Klondike Mountain Formation fossil
Hibiscus
 Undescribed Ypresian Klondike Mountain Formation fossil
 Hippuris
 Hippuris vulgaris
 Hydrangea
 †Hydrangea bendirei - 
 Undescribed Ypresian Klondike Mountain Formation fossil
Hymenophyllum
 †Hymenophyllum axsmithii - type locality for species
 †Hypnites
 †Hypnites brittoniae - type locality for species 
 †Hypnites knowltonii - type locality for species
 †Hypnites patens - type locality for species
 Hypserpa
 †Hypserpa cashmanensis - type locality for species
 †Hypserpa franklinensis - type locality for species

Plants I
 Ilex
  Cf. Ilex opaca
 Undescribed Ypresian Klondike Mountain Formation fossil
 Itea
 Undescribed Ypresian Klondike Mountain Formation

Plants J
 Juglans
 Undescribed Ypresian Klondike Mountain Formation fossil

Plants K
 
Kadsura
 Undescribed Ypresian Klondike Mountain Formation fossil
 Koelreuteria
 †Koelreuteria dilcheri

Plants L

 †Langeranthus - type locality for genus
 †Langeranthus dillhoffiorum - type locality for species
†Langeria – type locality for genus
 †Langeria magnifica – type locality for species
 Laurus
 †Laurus grandis
 †Leguminosites
 †Leguminosites bonseri
 Lemna
Undescribed Late Pleistocene Manis Mastodon site subfossil
Cf. Leucothoe
 Undescribed Ypresian Klondike Mountain Formation fossil
 Liquidambar
 Cf. †Liquidambar californica
 †Liquidambar changii
†Litseaphyllum
 Undescribed Ypresian Klondike Mountain Formation fossil
 Lycopodium
 Undescribed Late Miocene Vasa park Flora fossil
 Lygodium
 †Lygodium kaulfussi
 Undescribed Ypresian Klondike Mountain Formation fossil

Plants M

 Macaranga
 †Macaranga pugetensis – type locality for species
 †Macclintockia
 †Macclintockia pugetensis – type locality for species
†Macginicarpa
 Undescribed Ypresian Klondike Mountain Formation fossil
 †Macginitiea
 Cf. †Macginitea angustilobia
 †Macginitiea gracilis
 Magnolia
 Undescribed Early Miocene Douglas Canyon Formation fossil
 Undescribed Ypresian Klondike Mountain Formation fossil
 Malus
 Undescribed Ypresian Klondike Mountain Formation fossil
 Meliosma
 Undescribed Ypresian Klondike Mountain Formation fossil
 †Menispermites
 Cf. †Menispermites parvareolatus
 Menyanthes
Undescribed Late Pleistocene Manis Mastodon site subfossil
 Metasequoia
  †Metasequoia occidentalis
 Morus
 Undescribed  Ypresian Klondike Mountain Formation fossil
 Myriophyllum
 †Myriophyllum spicatum

Plants N
 Neviusia
 Undescribed Ypresian Klondike Mountain Formation fossil
 †Nordenskioldia
 Undescribed Ypresian Klondike Mountain Formation fossil
  Nuphar
 †Nuphar carlquistii
 Nyssa
 †Nyssa eydei - type locality for species

Plants O
 
 Ocotea
 Undescribed Ypresian Klondike Mountain Formation fossil
 Oemleria
 †Oemleria janhartfordae
 Orontium
 †Orontium wolfei
 Osmunda
 †Osmunda wehrii

Plants P
 †Palaeocarpinus
  †Palaeocarpinus barksdaleae
Undescribed Ypresian Klondike mountain Formation fossils
 †Palaeophytocrene
 Undescribed Ypresian Klondike Mountain Formation fossils
 †Paleoallium - type locality for genus
  †Paleoallium billgenseli - type locality for species
 Paliurus
 †Paliurus favonii -syn †Paliurus hesperius
 †Paraconcavistylon - type locality for genus
 †Paraconcavistylon wehrii - type locality for species
 Paulownia
 †Paulownia columbiana - type locality for species
 Pedicularis
Undescribed Late Pleistocene Manis Mastodon site subfossil
 †Pentacentron 
 †Pentacentron sternhartae  
  Persea
 †Persea lanceolata
 †Persea pseudocarolinensis
 Philadelphus
 Undescribed Ypresian Klondike Mountain Formation fossils
 †Phoebe
 Undescribed Ypresian Klondike Mountain Formation fossils
 †Photinia
  †Photinia pageae – type locality for species
 Phytocrene
 Cf. †Phytocrene acutissima
  Picea
Undescribed Ypresian Klondike mountain Formation fossils
 Pinus
 †Pinus latahensis
 †Pinus macrophylla
 †Pinus monticolensis
 †Pinus tetrafolia
 †Plafkeria - type locality for genus
 †Plafkeria rentonensis - type locality for species
 Undescribed Ypresian Klondike Mountain Formation fossils
 Plantago
Undescribed Late Pleistocene Manis Mastodon site subfossil
 †Platananthus
 Undescribed Ypresian Klondike Mountain Formation fossils
 Platanus
 †Platanus americana - type locality for species
 †Platanus dissecta
 †Platimeliphyllum
 †Platimeliphyllum durhamensis (syn=Fothergilla durhamensis) – type locality of species
 Platycarya
 Cf. †Platycarya pseudobrauni
 "Platyopuntia"
Undescribed Late Pleistocene Manis Mastodon site subfossil
 Polygonum
 †Polygonum amphibium
 Polypodium
 †‘Polypodium’ alternatum
 Populus
 †Populus heteromorpha
 †Populus lindgreni
 †Populus washingtonensis
 Undescribed Ypresian Klondike Mountain Formation fossils
 Potamogeton
  Potentilla
  Prunus
 †Prunus cathybrownae
 †Prunus rustii
 Pseudolarix
  †Pseudolarix wehrii
 †Pseudosalix
 Undescribed Ypresian 'Klondike Mountain Formation fossils
 Pteris
 †Pteris whatcomensis -type locality for species
 Pterocarya
 †Pterocarya mixta - type locality for species
 †Pterocarya pugetensis – type locality for species
 Undescribed Ypresian Klondike Mountain Formation fossils
 Pteroceltis
 Undescribed Ypresian Klondike Mountain Formation fossil
 †Pteronepelys
 †Pteronepelys wehrii
 †Pugetia - type locality for genus
 †Pugetia longifolia – type locality for species
 Pyracantha? - tentative record
 Aff. Physocarpus - tenative record

Plants Q

 Quercus
 †Quercus cognatus
  †Quercus hiholensis
 †Quercus leuca - type locality for species
 †Quercus sahnii - type locality for species
 †Quercus simulata
 †Quercus treleasii
 Undescribed Ypresian Klondike Mountain Formation fossil

Plants R

 Ranunculus
 †Republica (plant) – type locality for genus
 †Republica hickeyi - type locality for species
 †Republica kummerensis (syn=Dicotylophyllum kummerensis)- type locality for species
 †Republica litseafolia
 †Rhamnites
 †Rhamnites cashmanensis - type locality for species
 †Rhamnites franklinensis - type locality for species
 Rhododendron
 Undescribed Ypresian Klondike Mountain Formation fossils
  Rhus
 †Rhus boothillensis - type locality for species
 †Rhus garwellii - type locality for species
 †Rhus malloryi – type locality for species
 †Rhus republicensis - type locality for species
 Cf. †Rhus typhina
 †Rhysocaryoxylon
 †Rhysocaryoxylon fryxellii - type locality for species
 †Rhysocaryoxylon tertiarum - type locality for species
 Ribes
 Undescribed Ypresian Klondike Mountain Formation fossils
 Cf. Rinorea
 Rosa
 Rubus
 Undescribed Ypresian Klondike Mountain Formation fossils
 Rumohra
 †Rumohra bartonae - type locality for species

Plants S
  †Sabalites
 †Sabalites campbelli
 Sabia
 Undescribed Klondike Mountain Formation fossil
 Salix
 Cf. †Salix heartensis 
 †Salix spokanensis - type locality for species
 Undescribed Klondike Mountain Formation fossil
 Salpichlaena
 †Salpichlaena serrata
 Salvinia
 Cf. †Salvinia preauriculata
 Undescribed Klondike Mountain Formation fossil
 Sarcobatus
 Sassafras
 †Sassafras hesperia - type locality for species
 †Schoepfia
 †Schoepfia republicensis - type locality for species
 Sciadopitys
 Undescribed Klondike Mountain Formation fossil 
 Scirpus
 Undescribed Late Pleistocene Manis Mastodon site subfossil
 Selaginella
 Undescribed Klondike Mountain Formation fossil 
 Sequoia
 †Sequoia affinis
  †Shirleya
 †Shirleya grahamae
 Sloanea
 Undescribed Klondike Mountain Formation fossil 
 Smilax
 †Smilax magna
 Undescribed Klondike Mountain Formation fossil
Aff. Sorbus
 Undescribed Klondike Mountain Formation fossil
 Sparganium
 Spiraea
 Undescribed Klondike Mountain Formation fossil

Plants T

 
 Taiwania
 Undescribed Ypresian Klondike Mountain Formation fossil 
 Taxodium
 †Taxodium dubium
 Taxus
 Undescribed Ypresian Klondike Mountain Formation fossil
 †Ternstroemites
 †Ternstroemites ravenensis – type locality for species
 Undescribed Ypresian Klondike Mountain Formation fossil "Species A"
 Undescribed Ypresian Klondike Mountain Formation fossil "Species B"
 Tetracentron 
 †Tetracentron hopkinsii Pigg et al., 2007
 †Tetrapleuroxylon
 †Tetrapleuroxylon vantagiensis - type locality for species
 †Thalictrum
 Undescribed Late Pleistocene Manis Mastodon site subfossil
 Thuja
 Undescribed Ypresian Klondike Mountain Formation fossil
 Tilia
 †Tilia johnsoni – type locality for species
 Trochodendron
 †Trochodendron nastae
 Tsuga
 Tsuga heterophylla - subfossil
 †Tsuga latahensis – type locality for species
 Tsuga mertensiana - subfossil
 Undescribed Ypresian Klondike Mountain Formation fossil
 †Tsukada – type locality for genus
 †Tsukada davidiifolia – type locality for species
 Typha
 Typha latifolia
 Undescribed Ypresian Klondike Mountain Formation fossil

Plants U

 Ulmus
 †Ulmus baileyana - type locality for species
 †Ulmus chuchuanus
 †Ulmus miocenica - type locality for species
 †Ulmus okanaganensis
 †Ulmus oregoniana
 †Ulmus pacifica - type locality for species
 †Ulmus paucidentata
 †Ulmus speciosa
 Utricularia
Undescribed Late Pleistocene Manis Mastodon site subfossil

Plants V
 Viburnum
 †Viburnum pugetensis – type locality for species
 †Vinea - type locality for genus
 †Vinea pugetensis – type locality of species
 Vitis
 Undescribed Eocene Puget Group fossil
 Undescribed Ypresian Klondike Mountain Formation fossil

Plants W
 †Wessiea
 †Wessiea yakimaensis
 Woodwardia
 †Woodwardia aurora - type locality for species
 †Woodwardia clarus - type locality for species
 Woodwardia virginica

Plants Z
 Zannichellia
 Zannichellia palustris
 Zelkova
 Undescribed Eocene Puget Group fossil
 †Zingiberopsis
 Cf. †Zingiberopsis isonervosa 
 †Zizyphoides
Undescribed Ypresian Klondike Mountain Formation fossils

Poriferans
 Aphrocallistes
 Cf. †Aphrocallistes polytretos
 Eurete?
 †Eurete? goederti
 Farrea
 Tentatively reported undescribed Oligocene Lincoln Creek Formation fossil
 Hexactinella
 †Hexactinella conica – type locality for species
 †Hexactinella tubula – type locality for species
 Hyperbaena
 †Hyperbaena dilleri

Annelids
 Cf. Protula
 undescribed middle Eocene Puget Group Tukwila Formation fossil(s)
 †Rotularia
 †Rotularia tejonense
 Osedax
 undescribed Rupelian Makah Formation fossil(s)
 undescribed Rupelian-Chattian Pysht Formation fossil(s)
 undescribed Chattian Lincoln Creek Formation fossil(s)

Cnidarians

Cnidarians A-C
 Astrangia
 †Astrangia clarki – type locality for species
 Astreopora
 †Astreopora duwamishensis – type locality for species
 †Astreopora sanjuanensis – type locality for species
 Balanophyllia
 †Balanophyllia blakelyensis
 †Balanophyllia cowlitzensis – type locality for species
 †Balanophyllia fulleri – type locality for species
 †Balanophyllia teglandae – type locality for species
 †Balanophyllia variabilis
 †Balanophyllia washingtonensis – type locality for species
  Caryophyllia
 †Caryophyllia blakeleyensis – type locality for species
 †Caryophyllia woodmanensis – type locality for species
 †Caryophyllia wynoocheensis – type locality for species
 Coenocyathus
 †Coenocyathus hannibali – type locality for species
 Colpophyllia
 †Colpophyllia reagani – type locality for species

Cnidarians D-F
 Deltocyathus
 †Deltocyathus insperatus – type locality for species
  Dendrophyllia
 †Dendrophyllia cowlitzensis – type locality for species
 †Dendrophyllia hannibali – type locality for species
 †Dendrophyllia tejonensis
 †Dimorphastrea
 †Dimorphastrea vaughani – type locality for species
 †Discotrochus
 Undescribed Eocene Puget Group Tukwila Formation fossil(s)
  Eusmilia
 †Eusmilia bainbridgensis – type locality for species
 Flabellum
 †Flabellum californicum
 †Flabellum clarki
 †Flabellum hertleini – type locality for species

Cnidarians L-P
 Leptastrea
 †Leptastrea hertleini
 Madracis
 †Madracis crescentensis – type locality for species
 †Madracis stewarti – type locality for species
  Montipora
 †Montipora schencki – type locality for species
 Paracyathus
 Petrophyllia
 †Petrophyllia clarki
 †Petrophyllia weaveri – type locality for species

Cnidarians S-Z
 Sclerhelia? – tentative report
 Siderastrea
 Cf. †Siderastrea vancouverensis
 †Siderastrea washingtonensis – type locality for species
 Stephanocyathus
 †Stephanocyathus holcombensis – type locality for species
 Stylaster
 †Stylaster milleri – type locality for species
 Trochocyathus
 †Trochocyathus crooki
 †Trochocyathus nomlandi
 †Trochocyathus townsendensis – type locality for species
  Tubastraea
 †Tubastraea nomlandi – type locality for species
 Turbinolia
 †Turbinolia dickersoni
 †Turbinolia quaylei – type locality for species
 †Turbinolia weaveri – type locality for species

Echinoderms
 Brisaster
 undescribed middle Eocene Puget Group Tukwila Formation fossil(s)
 Eupatagus
 Cf. †Eupatagus carolinensis
 Isocrinus
Tentatively reported undescribed early Oligocene Pysht Formation fossil
 Schizaster

Brachiopods

  Craniscus
 †Craniscus edwilsoni – type locality for species
 Gryphus
 Undescribed Ypresian Crescent Formation fossil
 Hemithiris
 †Hemithiris reagani
 Terebratulina
 †Terebratulina unguicula
 †Terebratulina washingtonensis (syn=Rhynchonella washingtoniana)
 †Terebratulina weaveri

Molluscs

Molluscs A
 Acharax
 †Acharax dalli  (syn = Solemya dalli)
 Acila
 †Acila conradi
 †Acila decisa
 †Acila gettysburgensis
 †Acila pugetensis
 Acrilla
 †Acrilla (Ferminoscala) aragoensis
 †Acutostrea
 †Acutostrea idriaensis
 Aforia
 †Aforia clallamensis
 Amaea
 †Amaea olympicensis
 †Amaea washingtonensis
 Amauropsis
 †Amauropsis blakeleyensis
 Anadara
 †Anadara devincta
 Cf. †Anadara lakei
 †Anamirta
 Cf. †Anamirta milleri – or unidentified comparable form
 Ancistrolepis
 †Ancistrolepis rearensis
 †Anechinocardium
 †Anechinocardium lorenzanum
 Cf. †Anechinocardium weaveri 
 †Aperiploma
 †Aperiploma bainbridgensis
 †Archarax
 †Archarax dalli
 Architectonica
 Cf. †Architectonica congnata
  Argobuccinum
 †Argobuccinum goodspeedi
 †Argobuccinum mathewsonii
 †Argobuccinum washingtoniana
  †Aturia
 Cf. †Aturia alabamensis – or unidentified comparable form
 †Aturia angustata
 †Aturia grandior – type locality for species

Molluscs B
 Barbatia
 †Barbatia landesi
 Bathybembix
 †Bathybembix columbiana
 Batissa
 †Batissa dubia
 †Batissa newberryi
 Bonellitia
 †Bonellitia paucivaricata
 Brachidontes
 †Brachidontes (Brachidontes) cowlitzensis (syn=Modiolus cowlitzensis)
 †Brachidontes dichotomus
 †Bruclarkia
 †Bruclarkia oregonensis
 †Bruclarkia thor
 †Bruclarkia yaquinana
 Buccinum
 †Buccinum percrassum

Molluscs C
 Cadulus
 †Cadulus gabbi
 Calliostoma
 †Calliostoma mea
 Callithaca
 †Callithaca tenerrima
 †Calorebama
 †Calorebama inornata
 Calyptraea
 †Calyptraea diegoana
 †Calyptraea washingtonensis
 Cancellaria
 †Cancellaria birchi
 Cf. †Cancellaria oregonensis 
 Cf. †Cancellaria siletzensis 
 Cf. †Cancellaria simplex
 †Cancellaria wynoocheensis
 Cantharus
 †Cantharus cowlitzensis
 Cardiomya? – tentative report
 Cerithiopsis
 †Cerithiopsis vaderensis
 †Cerithiopsis washingtoniana
 Chama
 Chione
 †Chione ensifera
 †Chione securis
 Chlamys
 †Chlamys hastata
  †Chlamys islandica
 †Chlamys waylandi
 †Chrysodomus
 †Chrysodomus imperialis
 Cidarina
 †Cidarina antiquua – type locality for species
 †Cimomia
 †Cimomia hesperia – type locality for species
 Cirsotrema
 †Cirsotrema saundersi
 Clavus
 †Clavus fryei
  Clinocardium
 †Clinocardium meekianum
 †Clinocardium nuttallii
 Colus
 †Colus sekiuensis - type locality for species
 †Colwellia
 †Colwellia bretzi
 †Conchocele
 †Conchocele bisecta
  Conus
 †Conus aegilops
 †Conus cowlitzensis
 †Conus vaderensis
 †Conus weaveri
 †Conus weltoni
 Corbicula
 †Corbicula cowlitzensis
 Cf. †Corbicula willisi
 Corbula
 †Corbula dickersoni
 †Corbula parilis
 Costacallista
 †Costacallista conradiana (syn=Microcallista conradiana)
 †Cowlitzia
 †Cowlitzia washingtonensis
 Craspedochiton
 †Craspedochiton eernissei
 Crassatella
 †Crassatella uvasana
 †Crassatella wasana
 †Crassatella washingtoniana (syn=Crassatellites washingtoniana)
 Crenella – tentative report
 Crepidula
 †Crepidula praerupta
 †Crepidula princeps
 †Crepidula rostralis
 †Crepidula ungana
 †Cristispira
 †Cristispira pugetensis
 †Cryptochorda
 †Cryptochorda californica
 †Cryptolucina
 †Cryptolucina megadyseides
 Cryptomya
 †Cryptomya californica
 Cryptonatica
 Cryptonatica affinis
 Cyclammina
 †Cylichnina
 †Cylichnina tantilla
 Cyclocardia
 †Cyclocardia hannibali
 †Cyclocardia subtenta
 Cyclostremella
 Cymatium
 †Cymatium cowlitzense
 †Cymatium washingtonianum
 Cypraea
 †Cypraeogemmula
 †Cypraeogemmula warnerae

Molluscs D
 Delectopecten
 Undescribed Oligocene Lincoln Creek Formation fossil
 undescribed Eocene "Unit B" Cowlitz Formation fossil
 Dentalium
 †Dentalium porterensis
 †Dentalium pseudonyma
 †Dentalium schencki
 †Dentalium stramineum
 †Dentimitra
 †Dentimitra cretacea
 Diodora
 †Diodora stillwaterensis (syn=Fissuridea stillwaterensis)
 Dosinia
 †Dosinia whitleyi

Molluscs E
 Echinophoria
 †Echinophoria dalli
 †Echinophoria trituberculata (syn=Galeodea trituberculata)
 †Ectinochilus
 †Ectinochilus (Cowlitzia) canalifer supraplicata (syn=Rimella supraplicata)
 †Ectinochilus macilentus
 †Ectinochilus washingtonensis
 Emarginula
 †Emarginula dotyhillsensis – type locality for species
 †Eopustularia
 †Eopustularia goedertorum – type locality for species
 Epitonium
 †Epitonium (Boreoscala) condoni (syn=Arctoscala condoni)
 †Epitonium berthiaumei
 †Epitonium clallamense
 Cf. †Epitonium olympicensis
 †Epitonium schencki
 †Eratotrivia
 †Eratotrivia crescentensis
 Erginus
 †Erginus vaderensis
 Eulima
 †Eulima clarki
 †Eulima lewisiana
 Eurytellina
 †Eurytellina lorenzoensis
 Euspira
 †Euspira hotsoni
 †Euspira nuciformis
 †Eutrephoceras
 †Eutrephoceras eyerdami – type locality for species
 Exilia
 †Exilia clarki
 †Exilia dickersoni
 †Exilia mclellani

Molluscs F

 Falsifusus
 †Falsifusus marysvillensis
 †Ficopsis
 †Ficopsis cowlitzensis
 Cf. †Ficopsis redmondi
 Ficus
 †Ficus clallamensis
 †Ficus modesta
 †Ficus restorationensis
 †Ficus washingtonensis
 Fulgoraria
 †Fulgoraria indurata
 †Fulgoraria weaveri
 Fulgurofusus
 †Fulgurofusus washingtoniana
 Fusinus
 †Fusinus dilleri
 †Fusinus willisi

Molluscs G
  Galeodea
 †Galeodea apta
 †Galeodea crescentensis
 †Galeodea fax
 †Galeodea petrosa
 †Galeodea rex
 Gari
 Cf. †Gari (Gobraeus) hornii
 †Gari (Psammobia) columbiana - type locality for species
 †Gari (Psammobia) cowlitzensis - type locality for species
 †Gari (Psammobia) olequahensis - type locality for species
  Gemmula
 †Gemmula abacta
 †Gemmula barksdalei
 †Gemmula borgenae
 †Gemmula fasteni
 †Gemmula pluchra
 †Gemmula pulchra
  Glycymeris
 †Glycymeris fresnoensis
 †Glycymeris sagittata
 †Glycymeris wishkahensis
  Gyrineum
 †Gyrineum marshalli

Molluscs H

 Haplocochlias
 †Haplocochlias montis
 Hiatella
 Hiatella arctica
 Hipponix
 †Hipponix amoldi
 Homalopoma
 †Homalopoma hieroglyphica
 †Homalopoma umpquaensis
 †Humptulipsia - type locality for genus
 †Humptulipsia raui - type locality for species

Molluscs I

 Idas
 Idas olympicus - type locality of species
 Ischnochiton
 †Ischnochiton goederti
 Isognomon
 †Isognomon (Isognomon) clarki

Molluscs K
 Katherinella
 †Katherinella angustiformis
 †Katherinella angustifrons
 †Katherinella arnoldi
 †Katherinella augustifrons
 Kellia
 †Kellia twinensis
 †Kummelonautilus
 Cf. †Kummelonautilus cookanus

Molluscs L

 Lamelliconcha
 †Lamelliconcha eocenica
 Laevidentalium
 undescribed middle Eocene Puget Group Tukwila Formation fossil(s)
  Lepidochitona
 †Lepidochitona lioplax
 †Lepidochitona squiresi
 †Lepidochitona washingtonensis
 Lepidopleurus
 †Lepidopleurus propecajetanus
 Leptochiton
 †Leptochiton alveolus
 †Leptogyra
 ††Leptogyra squiresi – type locality for species
 Leukoma
 Leukoma staminea
 Liotia
 †Liotia washingtoniana – type locality for species
 †Litorhadia
 †Litorhadia washingtonensis (syn=Leda washingtonensis, Nuculana washingtonensis)
 Lucinoma
 †Lucinoma acutilineata
 †Lucinoma annulatum
 Cf. †Lucinoma columbiana 
 †Lucinoma hannibali
 Lyria
 †Lyria andersoni

Molluscs M
 Macoma
 †Macoma albaria
 †Macoma astori
 †Macoma calcarea
 †Macoma inquinata
  Macoma nasuta
 Cf. †Macoma secta
 †Macoma snohomishensis
 †Macoma sookensis
 †Macoma twinensis
 Macrocallista
 †Macrocallista cathcartensis
 Mactromeris
 †Mactromeris albaria
 †Mactromeris pittsburgensis
 Marcia
 †Marcia oregonensis
 Margarites
 †Margarites (Margarites) chappelli
 †Margarites (Margarites) serceus
 †Margarites (Pupillaria) columbiana
 Marginella
 †Marginella shepardae
 †Megistostoma
 †Megistostoma gabbiana
 Mitra
  †Mitra washingtoniana
 Modiolus
 Cf. †Modiolus restorationensis
 †Modiolus willapaensis
 †Molopophorus
 Cf. †Molopophorus newcombei
  Murex
 †Murex cowlitzensis
 †Murex sopenahensis
 †Mya
 †Mya arenaria
 †Mya truncata
 Mytilus
 †Mytilus dichotomus
 Mytilus edulis
 †Mytilus sammamishensis
 †Mytilus snohomishensis
 †Mytilus stillaguamishensis
 Cf. †Mytilus tichanovitchi

Molluscs N
 Nassa
 †Nassa eocenica (syn=Latirus eocenica)
 Nassarius
 †Nassarius mednica
  Natica
 Cf. †Natica clarki
 †Natica oligocenica
 †Natica teglandae
 †Natica vokesi
 †Natica weaveri
 †Nayadina
 †Nayadina batequensis
 †Nekewis
 †Nekewis washingtoniana
 Nemocardium
 †Nemocardium lincolnensis
 †Nemocardium linteum
  Neptunea
 †Neptunea landesi
 †Neptunea lincolnensis
 †Neptunea teglandae
 Nerita
 †Nerita triangulata
 Neverita
 †Neverita globosa
 †Neverita jamesae
 †Neverita reclusiana
 †Nitidavenus
 Cf. †Nitidavenus conradi
 Nucella
 †Nucella decemcostata
  Nucella lamellosa
 †Nucleolaria
 †Nucleolaria cowlitziana – type locality for species
 Nucula
 †Nucula hannibali
 Nuculana
 †Nuculana aikiensis
 †Nuculana alkiensis
 †Nuculana calkinsi
 †Nuculana chehalisensis
 †Nuculana cowlitzensis (syn=Leda cowlitzensis)
 Cf. †Nuculana elmana 
 †Nuculana grasslei
 †Nuculana posterolaevia – type locality for species
 †Nuculana vaderensis
 †Nuculana washingtoni

Molluscs O

 Odostomia
 Cf. †Odostomia winlockiana
 †Olequahia
 †Olequahia washingtoniana
 Olivella
 †Olivella mathewsonii
 Opalia
 †Opalia bravinderi
 Ophiodermella
 †Ophiodermella olympicensis
 Ostrea
 Ostrea lurida

Molluscs P
 †Pachycrommium
 †Pachycrommium clarki
 †Pachycrommium hendoni
 Pandora
 †Pandora vanwinkleae
 †Pandora washingtonensis
 Panopea
 †Panopea abrupta
 †Panopea ramonensis
 Parvamussium
 †Parvamussium stanfordense
 Patelloida
 †Patelloida tejonensis
 †Patelloida vancouverensis
 Patinopecten
 †Patinopecten dilleri
 Pecten
 †Pecten clallamensis
 †Perse? – tentative report
 Persicula
  Pitar
 †Pitar avenalensis
 †Pitar californiana
 †Pitar (Lammelliconcha) eocenica
 †Pitar quadratus
 Cf. †Pitar soledadensis
 †Pitar wasana
 Plagiocardium
 †Plagiocardium breweri
 Pleurofusia
 †Pleurofusia cowlitzensis (syn=Turricula cowlitzensis)
  Polinices
 †Polinices gesteri
 †Polinices hornii
 †Polinices lewisii
 †Polinices rectus
 †Polinices victorianus
 †Polinices washingtonensis
 Poromya
 †Poromya teglandae
 Portlandia
 †Portlandia chehalisensis - type locality for the species (synonym=Yoldia chehalisensis)
 †Portlandia packardi
 †Potamides
 †Potamides lewisiana
 †Potamides packardi
 †Priscofusus
 †Priscofusus chehalisensis
 Cf. †Priscofusus geniculus 
 †Priscofusus goweri
 †Priscofusus sanctaecrucis
 †Priscofusus slipensis
 †Priscofusus stewarti
 †Provanna
 †Provanna antiqua
 Psammacoma
 †Psammacoma arctata
 Pseudocardium
 †Pseudocardium packardi (syn=Spisula packardi)
 Pseudoliva
 †Pseudoliva lineata
 Pteria
 †Pteria clarki
 Cf. †Pteria pellucida
 Purpura
 †Purpura lurida
 Pyramidella
 †Pyramidella vaderensis

Molluscs R
 Rectiplanes? – tentative report
 Retusa
 †Retusa tantilla
 Rimella
 †Rimella elongata

Molluscs S
 Saxidomus
 †Saxidomus giganteus
 Scalina
 †Scalina lincolnensis
 Scaphander
 †Scaphander (Mirascapha) costata
 †Scaphander washingtonensis
 †Schedocardia
 †Schedocardia brewerii (syn=Acanthocardia brewerii)
 Semicassis
 †Semicassis pyshtensis
 Septifer
 †Septifer dichotomus
 Serripes
 †Serripes groenlandicus
 Sinum
 †Sinum obliquum
 Cf. †Sinum occidentalis
 †Sinum scopulosum
  Siphonalia
 †Siphonalia bicarinata
 †Siphonalia sopenahensis
 Solamen
 †Solamen snavelyi
 Solariella
 †Solariella (Solariella) olequahensis
 †Solariella cicca
 †Solariella garrardensis
 †Solariella kincaidi
 Solen
 †Solen columbianus
 †Solen sicarius
 Solena
 †Solena clarki
 †Solena columbina
 †Solena conradi
 Cf. †Solena parallelus
 †Spirocrypta
 †Spirocrypta pileum
 Spirotropis
 †Spirotropis kincaidi
 Spisula
 Cf. †Spisula hannibali
 †Spisula sookensis
 †Spisula twinensis
 Spondylus
 †Spondylus carlosensis
 Stenoplax
 †Stenoplax quimperensis
 †Sulcobuccinum
 †Sulcobuccinum dilleri
 †Sulcocypraea
 †Sulcocypraea mathewsonii
 Surculites
 †Surculites mathewsoni
 †Surculites wynoocheensis? – tentative report
 Sveltella
 †Sveltella keaseyensis? – tentative report

Molluscs T
 †Tejonia
 †Tejonia moragai
 Tellina
 †Tellina cowlitzensis
 †Tellina emacerata
 †Tellina soledadensis
 Tenagodus
 †Tenagodus bajaensis
 Teredo
Undescribed Cowlitz and Crescent Formation fossils
 Thais
 †Thais lamellosa
 Thracia
 †Thracia dilleri
 †Thracia schencki
 †Thracia trapezoides
 Thyasira
 †Thyasira folgeri
 †Thyasira hannibali
 †Thyasira peruviana? – tentative report
 †Thyasira xylodia - type locality for species
 Tivela
 †Tivela (Pachydesma) aragoensis
 †Tivelina
 †Tivelina vaderensis - type locality for species
 Tresus
 †Tresus capax
 †Tresus nuttallii
 Trochita
 Unidentified Oligocene Clallam Formation fossils
 Tudicla
 †Tudicla blakei
 †Tudicla trophonoides
 Turcica
 †Turcica caffea
 Turricula
 †Turricula ornata
 †Turricula washingtonensis
 Turris
 †Turris perversa
 †Turris pulchra (syn=Hemipleurotoma pulchra)
  Turritella
 †Turritella andersoni
 †Turritella blakeleyensis
 Cf. †Turritella buwaldana
 †Turritella oregonensis
 †Turritella porterensis
 †Turritella uvasana
 Cf. †Turritella vaderensis
 †Turritella wasana

Molluscs U
 Urosalpinx
 †Urosalpinx hannibali

Molluscs V
 Venericardia
 †Venericardia castor
 †Venericardia hannai
 †Venericardia hornii
 Cf. †Venericardia weaveri
 †Venericardia (Pacificor) clarki
 †Vertipecten
 †Vertipecten fucanus
 Vesicomya
 †Vesicomya chinookensis
 Volsella (mollusc)
 †Volsella restorationensis
 †Volsella trinominata

Molluscs W
 †Whitneyella
 †Whitneyella gabbi
 †Whitneyella markleyensis
 †Whitneyella sinuata
 †Whitneyella washingtoniana

Molluscs X
 Xenoturris
 †Xenoturris antiselli
 †Xylodiscula
 †Xylodiscula okutanii - type locality for species
 †Xylodiscula vitrea - type locality for species

Molluscs Y
 Yoldia
 †Yoldia astoriana
 †Yoldia blakeleyensis - type locality for species
 †Yoldia clallamensis – type locality for species
 †Yoldia duprei - type locality for species
 †Yoldia newcombi
 †Yoldia olympiana
 †Yoldia reagani
 †Yoldia sammamishensis - type locality for the species 
 †Yoldia temblorensis
 Cf. †Yoldia supramontereyensis - related form

Arthropods

Arthropods A
 Acidota
 Acidota crenata
 Aclypea
 Aclypea bituberosa
 Acrulia
 †Acrulia tumidula
 Actium
 Undescribed Klaloch site subfossil(s)
 †Adamsochrysa
 †Adamsochrysa wilsoni – type locality for species
  Aegialia
 Aegialia cylindrica
 Aegialia lacustris
 Agabus
 Undescribed Olympia beds Formation subfossil(s)
 Agathidium
 Undescribed Klaloch site subfossil(s)
 Agonum
 Agonum cupreum
 Agonum ferruginosum
 †Ainigmapsychops – type locality for genus
 †Ainigmapsychops inexspectatus – type locality for species
  †Allorapisma – type locality for genus
 †Allorapisma chuorum – type locality for species
 Alniphagus
 Alniphagus aspericollis
 Altica
 Cf. †Altica lazulina
 Amara
 Cf. Amara conflata
 Anthrax
 †Anthrax dentoni – type locality for species
†Antiquiala
 †Antiquiala snyderae
 Aphodius
 Undescribed Klaloch site subfossil(s)
 Apion
 Undescribed Klaloch site subfossil(s)
 †Aporolepas
 undescribed Ypresian-Bartionian Crescent Formation fossil(s)
 Aphrophora
 undescribed Ypresian Klondike Mountain Formation fossil(s)
 Arcoscalpellum
 †Arcoscalpellum knapptonensis – type locality for species
 †Arcoscalpellum raricostatum
 Arpedium
 Arpedium cribratum
 Artochia
 †Artochia productifrons
 Asiorestia
 Asiorestia pallida
 Atomaria
 Undescribed Olympia beds Formation subfossil(s)
 Auleutes
 Cf. Auleutes epilobii

Arthropods B
 Balanus
  Balanus crenatus
  Bembidion
 Bembidion bimaculatum
 Bembidion fortestriatum
 Bembidion haruspex
 Bembidion inaequale
 Bembidion nigripes
 Bembidion planiusculum
 Bembidion rusticum
 Bibio
 Undescribed Miocene Latah Formation fossil(s)
 Bledius
 Undescribed Klaloch site subfossils
 Undescribed Olympia beds Formation subfossil
 †Bombus
 †Bombus proavus – type locality for species
 Byrrhus
 Undescribed Olympia beds Formation subfossil

Arthropods C
 Calathus
 Calathus ruficollis
 Caligodorus
 Caligodorus opacus
 Callianassa
 †Callianassa knapptonensis
 †Callianassa oregonensis
 †Callianassa twinensis
 Cf. †Callianassa porterensis
 undescribed Oligocene Makah Formation fossil
 undescribed Oligocene Pysht Formation fossil
  Callianopsis
 †Callianopsis clallamensis - type locality for species
 Calosoma
 †Calosoma fernquisti – type locality for species
 Cancer
 †Cancer bainbridgensis
 Carabus
 Carabus taedatus
 Catops
 Cercyon
 Cf. †Cercyon luniger 
 Chlaenius
 Chlaenius interruptus
 Cicindela
 Cicindela oregona
 †Cimbrophlebia
  †Cimbrophlebia brooksi – type locality for species
  †Cimbrophlebia westae – type locality for species
 Cleptelmis
 †Cleptelmis ornata
 †Coeloma
 Coeloma martinezensis? - tentative report
 Colymbetes
 Corixa
 Corticaria
 Cossonus
 Cryptophagus
 Curimopsis
 Curimopsis albonotata
 Cymbiodyta
 Cytilus
 Cytilus alternatus
 Cytilus mimicus

Arthropods D
 Dascillus 
 †Dascillus latahensis – type locality for species
 Dendroctonus
 Dendroctonus rufipennis
 Dianous
 †Dianous nitidulus
 Diapterna
 Diapterna hamata
  †Dinokanaga
 †Dinokanaga andersoni – type locality for species
 †Dinokanaga dowsonae
 †Dinokanaga sternbergi – type locality for species
 †Dysagrion
  †Dysagrion pruettae - type locality for species
 †Dysagrionites
 †Dysagrionites delinei - type locality for species
 Dyschirius (syn=Dyschiriodes)
 Dyschirius laevifasciatus
 Dyschirius montanus
 Undescribed Olympia beds Formation subfossil
 Dytiscus
 †Dytiscus latahensis – type locality for species

Arthropods E
  Elaphrus
 †Elaphrus americanus
 †Elaphrus californicus
 †Elaphrus clairvillei
 †Elaphrus purpurans
 †Eoceneithycerus - type locality for genus
 †Eoceneithycerus carpenteri - type locality for species
 †Eoprephasma – type locality for genus
 †Eoprephasma hichensi – type locality for species
†Eorpa
 †Eorpa elverumi – type locality for species
  †Eorpa ypsipeda? – tentative report
 †Eosphecium
 Undescribed Ypresian klondike Mountain Formation fossils
 †Eourocerus - Type locality for genus
 †Eourocerus anguliterreus - type locality for species
 Epophthalmia
 †Epophthalmia biordinata – type locality for species

Arthropods F
 †Folindusia
 †Folindusia miocenica – type locality for species
 Foveoscapha
 Undescribed Klaloch site subfossils

Arthropods G
  Galeruca
 Galeruca rudis
  Gastrophysa
 Gastrophysa cyanea
 Geodromicus
 Undescribed Olympia beds Formation subfossils
  Georissus
 Undescribed Olympia beds Formation subfossils
  Gerris
 Undescribed Olympia beds Formation subfossils
 †Glyphithyreus
 †Glyphithyreus weaveri
 Gymnusa
 Undescribed Klaloch site subfossils
  Gyrinus
 Undescribed Olympia beds Formation subfossils

Arthropods H

 Hapalaraea
 Undescribed Klaloch site subfossils
 Helophorus
 Helophorus lacustris
 Cf. Helophorus oregonensis 
 Hesperibalanus
 †Hesperibalanus cornwalli – type locality for species
 Cf. †Hesperibalanus sookensis
 Heterlimnius
 Heterlimnius koebelei
 Heterosilpha
 Heterosilpha ramosa
 Hydrobius
 Hydrobius fuscipes
 Hydrothassa
 †Hydrothassa vittata
 Hygrotus
 Undescribed Olympia beds Formation subfossils
 Hylurgops
 †Hylurgops rugipennis
 Hymenarcys
 †Hymenarcys cridlandi – type locality for species

Arthropods I
 †Idemlinea- Type locality for genus
 †Idemlinea versatilis - Type locality for species
  Ilybius
 Ilybius quadrimaculatus
 Ischnosoma
 Ischnosoma pictum
 Isochnus
 Isochnus rufipes
 †Ithyceroides – type locality for genus
 †Ithyceroides klondikensis – type locality for species

Arthropods K
 Kalissus
 Kalissus nitidus
 †Klondikia – type locality for genus
 †Klondikia whiteae – type locality for species

Arthropods L
 Laccobius
 Cf. Laccobius ellipticus
 Lanternarius
 Lanternarius parrotus
 Lapsus
 Lapsus tristis
 †Latahcoris – type locality for genus
 †Latahcoris spectatus – type locality for species
 Leiodes
 Undescribed Olympia beds Formation subfossil(s)
 Lepidophorus
 Lepidophorus alternatus
 Cf. Lepyrus
 Undescribed Olympia beds Formation subfossil.
 Lioligus
 Lioligus nitidus
 Lioon
 Lioon simplicipes
 Liothorax
 Liothorax alternatus
 Lophomastix
 †Lophomastix altoonaensis
 †Lophomastix antiqua
 †Lophomastix boykoi
 †Lophomastix kellyi
 Loricera
 Loricera decempunctata

Arthropods M

 Magdalis
 †Megaraphidia
 †Megaraphidia klondika - type locality for species
 Megarthrus
 †Megokkos
 †Megokkos alaskensis
 †Megokkos feldmanni
 †Megokkos macrospinus
 Melanoides
 †Melanoides fettkei
 †Metacarcinus
 †Metacarcinus starri
 †Metanephrocerus
 †Metanephrocerus belgardeae – type locality for species
 Microedus
 Microlestes
 Micropeplus
 †Micropeplus cribratus
 †Micropeplus laticollis
 †Micropeplus nelsoni
 †Micropeplus punctatus
 †Miocordulia – type locality for genus
 †Miocordulia latipennis – type locality for species
 †Miopsyche – type locality for genus
 †Miopsyche alexanderi – type locality for species
 †Miopsyche martynovi – type locality for species
 Morychus
 †Morychus oblongus
 Munida
 †Munida branti - type locality for species
 †Munida witteae - type locality for species
 †Mursia
 †Mursia marcusana
 Mycetoporus
 †Mycetoporus punctatissimus
 †Myrmeciites
 Unidentified Ypresian Klondike Mountain Formation fossils

Arthropods N
 Nebria
 †Nebria metallica
 †Nebria sahlbergi
 †Neoephemera
 †Neoephemera antiqua – type locality for species
 Nitidotachinus
 Cf. †Nitidotachinus tachyporoides
 Notaris
 †Notaris aethiops
 †Notaris puncticollis
 Notiophilus
 †Notiophilus aquaticus
 †Notiophilus simulator
 †Notiophilus sylvaticus
  Nymphes
 †Nymphes georgei – type locality for species

Arthropods O

 Ochthebius
 †Ochthebius discretus
 Cf. †Ochthebius holmbergi
 Ocypus
 †Oecophylla
 †Oecophylla kraussei – type locality for species
 †Okanagrion - type locality for genus
 †Okanagrion dorrellae - type locality for species
 †Okanagrion hobani
 †Okanagrion liquetoalatum - type locality for species
 †Okanagrion threadgillae - type locality for species
 †Okanagrion worleyae - type locality for species
 †Okanopteryx
 †Okanopteryx jeppesenorum - type locality for species
 Olophrum
 †Olophrum boreale
 †Olophrum consimile
 Opisthius
 †Opisthius richardsoni
 Orchestes
 †Orchestes pallicornis
 Cf. Oreodytes
 Orobanus
 Oropus
 †Osmylidia
 †Osmylidia glastrai - type locality for species 
 Oxytelus
 Oxytelus laqueatus
 Oxytelus niger

Arthropods P
 Paguristes
 †Paguristes hokoensis
 †Palaeopsychops
  †Palaeopsychops marringerae – type locality for species
  †Palaeopsychops timmi – type locality for species
 †Palecphora
 Undescribed Ypresian Klondike Mountain Formation fossils
 Pardalosus
 †Pardalosus pardalis
 Patrobus
 †Patrobus fossifrons
 †Patrobus stygicus
 Pelecomalium
 †Pelecomalium testaceum
 Pelenomus
 †Pelenomus squamosus
 Pelophila
 †Pelophila borealis
 Periope
 †Periope ivesi – type locality for species
 †Petrolystra
 Undescribed Ypresian Klondike Mountain Formation fossils
 Phaedon
  Phaedon armoraciae
 †Phaedon oviforme
 †Phaedon prasinellus
 Phlaeopterus
 Phloeosinus
 Cf. †Phloeosinus keeni
 Phloeotribus
 †Phloeotribus lecontei
 Phryganea
 †Phryganea spokanensis – type locality for species
 Pityophthorus
 †Pityophthorus digestus – or unidentified comparable form
 †Pityophthorus nitidulus
 Planolinoides
 †Planolinoides pectoralis
 Plateumaris
 †Plateumaris dubia
 †Plateumaris germari
 †Plateumaris neomexicana
 †Plateumaris nitida
 Platystethus
 †Platystethus americanus
 †Polystoechotites
  †Polystoechotites barksdalae - type locality for species
  †Polystoechotites falcatus - type locality for species
  †Polystoechotites lewisi - type locality for species
 †Proneuronema
 †Proneuronema wehri - type locality for species
 †Propalosoma – type locality for genus
 †Propalosoma gutierrezae - type locality for species
 Proteinus
 Pselaptrichus
 Pseudips
 Pseudips concinnus (syn=Ips concinnus)
 Pseudohylesinus
 †Pseudohylesinus nebulosus
 Cf. †Pseudohylesinus sericeus
 Pseudopsis
 Aff. †Pseudopsis sulcata
 Pterostichus
 †Pterostichus adstrictus
 †Pterostichus castaneus
 †Pterostichus fernquisti – type locality for species
 †Pterostichus pumilus
 †Pterostichus riparius
 Pteryngium
 †Pteryngium crenatum
 Pycnoglypta
 †Pycnoglypta campbelli

Arthropods Q
 Quedius
 Undescribed Olympia beds Formation subfossils

Arthropods R
 
 Ranina
 Ranina americana
 Raninoides
 Reichenbachia
 †Republica (damselfly) - type locality for genus
 †Republica weatbrooki - type locality for species
 †Republicopteron - type locality for genus
 †Republicopteron douseae - type locality for species
 Rhantus
 Rhyncolus
 †Rhyncolus brunneus

Arthropods S
 Saldula
 Scaphinotus
 †Scaphinotus marginatus
 Sitona
 Sonoma
 †Stenodiafanus - type locality for genus
 †Stenodiafanus westersidei - type locality for species
 Stenus
 Stephostethus
 Steremnius
 †Steremnius carinatus
 †Steremnius tuberosus
 Sthereus
 †Sthereus multituberculatus
 †Sthereus quadrituberculatus
 Syntomium
 Cf. †Syntomium malkini
 Syntomus
 †Syntomus americanus

Arthropods T
 Tachinus
 Tachinus angustatus
 Tachinus crotchii
 Tachinus frigidus
 Cf. Tachinus instabilis
 Tachinus mimus
 Tachinus thruppi
 Tetrascapha
 Undescribed Klaloch site subfossils
 Thanatophilus
 Thanatophilus lapponicus
 Thanatophilus sagax
 Tipula
 †Tipula latahensis – type locality for species
 Tournotaris
 Cf. Tournotaris bimaculatus
 Cf. Trechiama
 Undescribed Klaloch site subfossil similar to Trechiama
 Trechus
 Trechus (Trechus) chalybeus
 Trechus (Trechus) oregonensis
 Cf. Trechus ovipennis
 Trichalophus
 Trichalophus didymus
 Trichopeltarion
 †Trichopeltarion berglundorum
 Trypophloeus
 †Trypophloeus salicis

Arthropods U
 †Ulmeriella
 †Ulmeriella latahensis – type locality for species
 †Ulteramus – type locality for genus
 †Ulteramus republicensis – type locality for species
 Unamis
 Undescribed Kalaloch Site Pleistocene subfossil
 Upogebia
 †Upogebia barti - type locality for species
 †Upogebia eocenica - type locality for species

Arthropods W
 †Whetwhetaksa - Type locality of the genus
 †Whetwhetaksa millerae - Type locality of the species

Arthropods Y

 †Ypshna 
 †Ypshna brownleei - Type locality of the species

Arthropods Z
 †Zanthopsis
 †Zanthopsis vulgaris

Fish

* †Aglyptorhynchus
 †Aglyptorhynchus columbianus – type locality for species
 Amia
 †"Amia" hesperia
  †Amyzon
 †Amyzon aggregatum
 Diaphus?
 tentatively identified Chattian Lincoln Creek Formation fossil(s) 
 †Eosalmo
 †Eosalmo driftwoodensis
 †Gyrace
 †Gyrace occidentalis (syn=Squalus occidentalis)
 Heptranchias
 †Heptranchias howelli
 Hiodon
  †Hiodon woodruffi
 Isurus
 Tentatively reported Undescribed Ypresian Crescent Formation fossil
 †Libotonius
 †Libotonius pearsoni
 Mitsukurina
 undescribed middle Eocene Puget Group Tukwila Formation fossil(s)
 Nolorhynchus
 †Oxygoniolepidus - type locality for genus
 †Oxygoniolepidus washingtonensis - type locality for species
 †Palaeohypotodus
 Undescribed Ypresian Crescent Formation fossil
 †Priscacara
 †Priscacara campi – type locality for species
 †Probathygadus - type locality for genus
 †Probathygadus keaseyensis - type locality for species
 †Rhinoscymnus
 †Rhinoscymnus viridadama - type locality for species
 Somniosus
 †Somniosus gonzalezi - type locality for species
 †Triaenodon
 undescribed middle Eocene Puget Group Tukwila Formation fossil(s)

Birds

 †Diomedavus - type locality for genus
 †Diomedavus knapptonensis - type locality for species
 †Klallamornis - type locality for genus 
 †Klallamornis abyssa - type locality for species
 †Klallamornis buchanani (syn=Tonsala buchanani) – type locality for species
 †Klallamornis clarki  - type locality for species
 †Makahala - type locality for genus
 †Makahala mirae - type locality for species
 †Olympidytes - type locality for genus
 †Olympidytes thieli - type locality for species
 †Tonsala – type locality for genus
 †Tonsala hildegardae – type locality for species

Reptiles
 †Acherontemys – type locality for genus
 †Acherontemys heckmani – type locality for species
 Charina
 Charina bottae
  Crotalus
Undescribed Blancan Ringold Formation "Taunton fauna" subfossil(s)
 Elaphe
 †Elaphe pliocenica
 Lampropeltis
 Lampropeltis getulus
 Pantherophis
 Pantherophis vulpinus (syn=Elaphe vulpina)
 Pituophis
  Pituophis catenifer

 †Tauntonophis – type locality for genus
 †Tauntonophis morganorum – type locality for species
  Thamnophis
Undescribed Pliocene Ringold Formation "Taunton fauna" subfossil(s)

Mammals

Mammals A
 †Alilepus
 †Alilepus vagus
 Cf. †Alilepus wilsoni
  †Allodesmus
 †Allodesmus demerei - type locality for species
 undescribed Oligocene Pysht Formation fossils of possible Allodesmus affinity.
 Ammospermophilus
 †Ammospermophilus hanfordi
 †Aphelops
 Cf. †Aphelops mutilus

Mammals B
 Bassariscus
 Cf. †Bassariscus casei
 †Behemotops – type locality for genus
 †Behemotops proteus – type locality for species
 Bison
 Bison antiquus
 Undescribed Late Pleistocene Manis Mastodon site subfossil
 †Borealodon – type locality for genus
 †Borealodon osedax – type locality for species
  †Borophagus
 †Borophagus diversidens
 †Borophagus hilli
 †Bretzia
 †Bretzia pseudalces – type locality for species
 undescribed Early Pliocene Ellensberg Formation fossil(s)
 †Buisnictis
 †Buisnictis breviramus

Mammals C
  †Camelops
 Indeterminate Irvingtonian Delight site, Adams County subfossil
 Indeterminate Blancan Ringold Formation fossil
 Canis
 †Canis lepophagus
  †Capromeryx
 †Capromeryx tauntonensis – type locality for species
 Castor
 †Castor californicus
  Cervus
 †Cervus brevitrabalis
  †Cormocyon
 †Cormocyon copei
  †Cosoryx
 †Cosoryx (Subcosoryx) cerroensis
  †Cranioceras
 Cf. †Cranioceras unicornis 
 †Cynarctus
 †Cynarctus crucidens

Mammals D
  †Desmatophoca
 †Desmatophoca brachycephala – type locality for species
  †Desmostylus
 †Desmostylus hesperus
  †Diceratherium
 †Diceratherium annectens
 "Blue lake rhino" - unidentified species preserved as a cast in basalt
 †Dinofelis
 Cf. †Dinofelis palaeoonca
 †Dipoides
 †Dipoides rexroadensis

Mammals E
 
 †Enhydrocyon
 Undescribed Monroecreekian Wildcat Creek beds fossil 
  †Eporeodon
 Undescribed Monroecreekian Wildcat Creek beds fossil 
 Equus
 †Equus simplicidens
  †Eucyon
 †Eucyon davisi

Mammals F
 †Fucaia – type locality for genus
 †Fucaia buelli – type locality for species
 †Fucaia goedertorum – type locality for species

Mammals H
 

†Hemiauchenia
 Cf. †Hemiauchenia macrocephala 
  †Hipparion
 †Hipparion condoni
 †Hoplictis
 †Hoplictis grangerensis
 †Hypertragulus
 Undescribed Monroecreekian Wildcat Creek beds fossil 
 †Hypolagus
 †Hypolagus edensis
 †Hypolagus furlongi
 †Hypolagus gidleyi
 †Hypolagus ringoldensis – type locality for species

Mammals K
 †Kolponomos
 †Kolponomos clallamensis
 Aff. †Kronokotherium
 Undescribed Miocene Clallam Formation fossil.
 Undescribed Late Eocene Pysht Formation fossil.

Mammals L
 
 †Leptarctus
 Undescribed Clarendonian Ellensburg Formation fossil
 Lynx
 Lynx canadensis
 Cf. Lynx rufus

Mammals M

 
 †Mammut
 †Mammut americanum
 †Mammuthus
 †Mammuthus columbi
  †Mammuthus primigenius
 †Megalonyx
  †Megalonyx leptostomus
  †Megatylopus
 Cf. †Megatylopus cochrani
 †Merycoides
  †Mesoreodon
 †Mimomys
 †Mimomys mcknighti
 †Mimomys taylori
 †Miohippus
 Cf. †Miohippus equiceps
 †Miohippus equinanus? – tentative report
 Mirounga
 Mirounga angustirostris.
 Mustela
 Cf. †Mustela rexroadensis

Mammals N
 †Nekrolagus
 Cf. †Nekrolagus progressus
  Neotoma
 Cf. †Neotoma fossilis
 Cf. †Neotoma quadriplicata

Mammals O
 Odocoileus
  Odocoileus hemionus
 †Olympicetus - type locality for genus
 †Olympicetus avitus - type locality for species
 Ondatra
 †Ondatra minor

Mammals P
 †Paenemarmota
 Cf. †Paenemarmota sawrockensis 
  Cf. †Palaeolagus
 †Paracryptotis
 †Paracryptotis rex
 †Paraenhydrocyon
 †Paraenhydrocyon josephi
 †Parailurus
  †Paramylodon
 †Paramylodon harlani
  Peromyscus
 †Peromyscus nosher
 Phenacomys 
 Phenacomys intermedius
  †Platygonus
 †Platygonus pearcei
 †Plionarctos
 †Plionarctos harroldorum – type locality for species
 †Procastoroides
 Cf. †Procastoroides idahoensis
 Procyon – tentative report
 †Prodipodomys
  †Promerycochoerus
 †Promerycochoerus superbus
 †Prosthennops
 Pterynotus
 †Pterynotus washingtonicus – type locality for species
 Puma
 Puma concolor? – tentative report
 †Puma lacustris (syn=Felis lacustris)

Mammals R
 Rangifer

Mammals S
 †Salishicetus - type locality for genus
 †Salishicetus meadi - type locality for species
 †Satherium
 †Satherium piscinarium
 Scapanus
 †Sitsqwayk
 †Sitsqwayk cornishorum – type locality for species
  Sorex
 Cf. †Sorex meltoni
 †Sorex powersi
 Spermophilus
 Cf. †Spermophilus howelli
 †Spermophilus russelli
 Spilogale
 †Squaloziphius – type locality for genus
 †Squaloziphius emlongi – type locality for species

Mammals T
 Taxidea
 Taxidea taxus - subfossil
  †Teleoceras
 †Teleoceras hicksi
 Cf. †Teleoceras major
 Thomomys
 Cf. †Thomomys gidleyi
Undescribed Pliocene Ringold Formation fossil
 †Trigonictis
 †Trigonictis cookii
 †Trigonictis macrodon

Mammals W-Z
 †Wimahl - type locality for genus
 †Wimahl chinookensis - type locality for species
 †Zarhinocetus
 †Zarhinocetus donnamatsonae – type locality for species

References

Uncited entries
 

Cenozoic
Washington